Primary cutaneous immunocytoma is a skin condition that represents a low grade B-cell lymphoma related to marginal zone B-cell lymphoma but with a predominance of cells having plasmacytic features.

See also 
 Primary cutaneous marginal zone lymphoma
 Skin lesion

References 

Lymphoid-related cutaneous conditions
Lymphoma